A list of British films released in 1928.

1928

See also
 1928 in British music
 1928 in British television
 1928 in film
 1928 in the United Kingdom

External links
 

1928
Films
Lists of 1928 films by country or language
1920s in British cinema